"Bella d'estate" is an Italian song composed by Mango and Lucio Dalla and performed by Mango. It is included in the 1986 album, Adesso. The single was Mango's major hit, selling over 350,000 copies.

The song was also recorded by Mango in Spanish with the title "Flor de verano", included in the Spanish version of the album titled Ahora.

In 2008 the a cappella group Neri per Caso released a cover version featuring the same Mango, as their second single from the album Angoli Diversi. In August 2020 Mika released a version of the song featuring Michele Bravi. The same year Tiziano Ferro included a cover of the song in the album Accetto miracoli: l'esperienza degli altri; a videoclip was released in August 2021.

Track listing
7" single –  Ariola 109 454    
 "Bella d'estate" (Mango - Lucio Dalla) -  	 	6:38
 "Stella del nord" (Mango - Alberto Salerno) -  	6:00

Charts

References

 

1987 singles
Italian songs
1987 songs
Songs written by Lucio Dalla